Alessio di Mauro and Alessandro Motti were the defending champions but Motti decided not to participate.
di Mauro played alongside Andrea Arnaboldi but lost in the semifinals.
Brydan Klein and Dane Propoggia won the final 3–6, 6–4, [12–10] against Stefano Ianni and Gianluca Naso.

Seeds

Draw

Draw

References
 Main Draw

Carisap Tennis Cup - Doubles
2012 - Doubles